Vera Mackey is a former camogie player, an All Ireland finalist in 1980.

Career
The daughter of hurler John Mackey she played in two All Ireland club finals with Ahane. She won an All Ireland junior medal and two Gael Linn Cup inter provincial medals with Munster.

References

External links
 Camogie.ie Official Camogie Association Website
 Wikipedia List of Camogie players

Year of birth missing (living people)
Limerick camogie players
Living people